Wan dam may refer to:

 Wan Dam, Akola - a dam near Akola on Wan river
 Wan Dam, Ambejogai - a dam near Ambejogai on Wan river